A. K. M. Sirazul Islam Khan ( – 14 December 2019) was a Bangladeshi academic and microbiologist. He was a professor of Soil, Water and Environment Department (Previously Soil Science Department) and Microbiology Department of the University of Dhaka and also the first vice-chancellor of Jagannath University.

Biography
Khan was the chairman of Dhaka University's microbiology department. He also served as the chairman of Center for Advanced Research in Sciences. He was the dean of North South University's School of Health and Life Science too. Besides, he served as the dean of Dhaka University's Faculty of Biological Science and chairman of Bangladesh Society of Microbiologists. He served as  vice-chancellor of Jagannath University from 8 February 2006 to 26 July 2008.

Khan died on 14 December 2019 at the age of 76.

References

1940s births
2019 deaths
People from Dhaka District
Bangladeshi academic administrators
Bangladeshi microbiologists